Group B of the EuroBasket Women 2021 took place between 17 and 20 June 2021. The group consisted of Greece, Italy, Montenegro and Serbia and played its games at the Pavelló Municipal Font de Sant Lluís in Valencia, Spain.

Teams

Standings

Matches
All times are local (UTC+2).

Montenegro vs Greece

Serbia vs Italy

Greece vs Serbia

Italy vs Montenegro

Montenegro vs Serbia

Italy vs Greece

References

External links
Official website

Group B
2020–21 in Greek basketball
2020–21 in Italian basketball
2020–21 in Montenegrin basketball
2020–21 in Serbian basketball